Thomas Colby may refer to:

Thomas Colby (MP for Melcombe Regis) (1530–1588), English politician
Thomas Colby (MP for Thetford) (died 1588), MP for Thetford
Sir Thomas Colby, 1st Baronet (1670–1729), MP for Rochester
Thomas Frederick Colby (1784–1852), British major-general and director of the Ordnance Survey

See also
Colby (surname)